The Dawson Range is a subrange of the Selkirk Mountains of the Columbia Mountains in southeastern British Columbia, Canada, located southeast of Rogers Pass in Glacier National Park. The highest point is Mount Dawson. Other peaks of the range include Mount Selwyn, Mount Donkin, and Mount Fox.

References

Selkirk Mountains
Glacier National Park (Canada)